Jebel Musa, Jabal Moussa or Gebel Musa (Arabic: جبل موسى, 'Mountain of Moses') may refer to:

 Mount Sinai, a mountain in the Sinai Peninsula of Egypt 
Biblical Mount Sinai
 Jebel Musa (Morocco), a mountain in Morocco
 Jabal Moussa Biosphere Reserve, a natural area in Lebanon
 Musa Dagh, a mountain in Turkey, known as Jebel Musa in Arabic

See also 
 Musa (disambiguation)
 Jabal Moussa Biosphere Reserve, a natural area in Lebanon